Rodolfo Perea Cifuentes (born 5 October 1929) was a Mexican diver. He competed in two events at the 1952 Summer Olympics.

Notes

References

External links
 

1929 births
Possibly living people
Mexican male divers
Olympic divers of Mexico
Divers at the 1952 Summer Olympics